Kirwin Reservoir is a reservoir in Phillips County, Kansas, United States.  It is located next to the city of Kirwin in northern Kansas.  The U.S. Bureau of Reclamation built it and continues to operate it for the purposes of flood control and area irrigation. The Kirwin National Wildlife Refuge lies on its shores.

History
Following the agricultural devastation of the Dust Bowl during the 1930s, local residents and state officials advocated for construction of a dam in the Solomon River basin to create a reservoir for irrigation. The U.S. Bureau of Reclamation began investigating potential sites in 1939. The Flood Control Act of 1944 authorized construction of Kirwin Dam and Reservoir as part of the Pick-Sloan Missouri Basin Program, but World War II and its aftermath delayed the effort.

Kirwin Irrigation District No. 1 organized in 1950. A massive flood of the entire Kansas River basin stoked public demand for flood control infrastructure. In response, the U.S. Congress passed an appropriation act directing the immediate construction of Kirwin Dam and Reservoir for flood control, but allowing for further study before starting irrigation operations. Construction of Kirwin Dam began in March 1952 and lasted until completion of the project in August 1955. Storage of water in the reservoir began in October 1955. The next month, contractors started building Kirwin Canal and its extensions east of the dam, finishing construction in January 1958.

Kirwin National Wildlife Refuge was established in 1954 as an overlay project on the flood control and irrigation efforts at the site. The first such national refuge in Kansas, it was created to conserve and manage local wildlife, specifically migratory birds.

Geography
It lies in northern Kansas in the Smoky Hills region of the Great Plains. The reservoir is located entirely within Phillips County.

The reservoir is impounded at its eastern end by Kirwin Dam. The North Fork Solomon River and Bow Creek are the reservoir's primary inflows; the North Fork Solomon is also its primary outflow.

Kansas Highway 9 runs generally east-west north of the reservoir. East 1100 Road, a paved county road, runs generally north-south immediately east of the reservoir.

There is one settlement at the reservoir:  Kirwin, Kansas, located immediately below the dam.

Hydrography
The surface area, surface elevation, and water volume of the reservoir fluctuate based on inflow and local climatic conditions. In terms of capacity, the Bureau of Reclamation vertically divides the reservoir into a set of pools based on volume and water level, and it considers the reservoir full when filled to the capacity of its active conservation pool.

Since the reservoir's initial flooding, sedimentation has gradually accumulated on the reservoir bottom thus raising its elevation.

Infrastructure
A concrete spillway controlled by 15 gated sluiceways is located at the south end of the dam. It empties into a short channel which joins the North Fork Solomon River east of the dam. Outlet works through the dam, including a stilling well, empty directly into the river and the Kirwin Main Canal.

It then branches into the Kirwin North Canal, which continues for another , and the Kirwin South Canal, which crosses the river in a siphon and continues along its south side for another .  of lateral canals extend outward from all three central canals.

Management
The U.S. Bureau of Reclamation operates and maintains Kirwin Dam and Reservoir. The local irrigation authority, Kirwin Irrigation District No. 1, operates and maintains the canals, laterals, and drains. The U.S. Fish and Wildlife Service administers the reservoir surface and most of the surrounding land as the Kirwin National Wildlife Refuge.

Recreation
Kirwin Reservoir is open for sport fishing year-round. The Fish and Wildlife Service permits hunting for waterfowl and upland game during appropriate seasons.

Wildlife

Fish species resident in Kirwin Reservoir include black crappie, channel catfish, largemouth and smallmouth bass, walleye, and wiper. The surrounding wildlife refuge is home to a broad variety of animals including mule and white-tailed deer, hawks, owls, pheasants, prairie chickens, bobwhite quail, and Rio Grande turkeys. During the winter, the area hosts populations of both bald and golden eagles. In addition, Kirwin serves as a staging point for water birds such as cormorants and pelicans.

A remote portion of the refuge serves as a Research Natural Area consisting of bluestem  and grama prairie grasses.

See also
 List of Kansas state parks
 List of lakes, reservoirs, and dams in Kansas
 List of rivers of Kansas

References

External links
 Kirwin Dam, U.S. Bureau of Reclamation
 Kirwin National Wildlife Refuge, U.S. Fish and Wildlife Service
 Kirwin Unit, U.S. Bureau of Reclamation

Dams in Kansas
Reservoirs in Kansas
United States Bureau of Reclamation dams
Buildings and structures in Phillips County, Kansas
Dams completed in 1955
Bodies of water of Phillips County, Kansas
1955 establishments in Kansas